Fools Rush In is a 1997 American romantic comedy film starring Matthew Perry and Salma Hayek, directed by Andy Tennant.

Plot
Alex Whitman, a New York City architect, is sent to Las Vegas to supervise the construction of a nightclub that his firm has been hired to build. He is a strait-laced WASP-ish type and meets Isabel Fuentes, a free-spirited Mexican-American photographer. Alex and Isabel are immediately attracted and spend the night together. In the morning, Isabel quietly slips away while Alex is still asleep.

Three months later, Isabel finds Alex at work to tell him she is pregnant with his child. She has decided to keep and raise the child alone, although it will disappoint her family. Isabel asks Alex to a family dinner so they can meet the baby's father at least once. He agrees, and despite some cultural differences, finds himself more attracted to Isabel. Though Isabel is prepared to say goodbye, Alex suggests they pursue a relationship. 

Alex proposes and they quickly marry at a Las Vegas wedding chapel (with an Elvis impersonator serving as a witness). However they gradually, both wonder if they belong together, especially as Alex struggles to balance his New York career with Isabel's desire to stay in Nevada, near her family.

In early June, when Alex is at his company's NYC office his boss tells him to return on July 1 for a new project and promotion. He secretly agrees to it, although he'd promised Isabel they wouldn't go until after the baby is born in October.

The newlyweds fight when Isabel finds out why he's been so busy and distant. Isabel suffers from a medical complication. While in the hospital, she lets Alex believe she lost the baby and says they're not meant to be together. 

Disappointed, Alex returns to New York while Isabel, who is still pregnant, goes to Mexico to stay with her great-grandmother. After being served with divorce papers, he sees several 'signs' such as a priest telling him to watch carefully for guidance, he almost trips over a chihuahua, sees a landscape photo of the Grand Canyon and finally a young hispanic girl named Isabel can't keep her eyes off him. Alex realizes he loves Isabel and wants her more than his career. 

Alex travels to rural Mexico to find Isabel, unaware she is still pregnant. Her great-grandmother, who only speaks Spanish, reveals that Isabel loves Alex and is driving back to Las Vegas to have her baby (which he only understands as she has returned to Las Vegas). He intercepts her at the Hoover Dam and says he loves her, then realizes she is still pregnant. 

Isabel suddenly goes into labor and gives birth to a daughter which coincides with their divorce becoming finalized. Soon after they remarry with both families present, atop a cliff overlooking the Grand Canyon.

Cast
 Matthew Perry as Alex Whitman
 Salma Hayek as Isabel Fuentes-Whitman
 Jon Tenney as Jeff
 Carlos Gómez as Chuy
 Tomas Milian as Tomas Fuentes
 Siobhan Fallon as Lainie
 John Bennett Perry as Richard Whitman
 Stanley DeSantis as Judd Marshall
 Suzanne Snyder as Cathy Stewart
 Anne Betancourt as Amalia Fuentes
 Jill Clayburgh as Nan Whitman
 Garret Davis as Stan
 Annie Combs as Dr. Lisa Barnes, Ob-Gyn
 Annetta Ray as minister performing marriage
 Debby Shively  as Donna, construction manager
 Robert Arevalo as Miguel Fuentes

Soundtrack
The following list of titles represents the music used in sequence with the movie.

 Santa Claus is Comin' to Town – Burl Ives (office Christmas party scene)
 Jailhouse Rock – Elvis Presley (Alex gets excited about Las Vegas)
 Las Abajeñas – Mariachi Reyes de Aserradero
 Two to Tango – Vanessa Daou (one-night stand/morning after)
 Para Donde Vas – The Iguanas (playing while Alex follows Isabel in his car, just after she announces she's pregnant)
 El Pichon
 La Martiniana
 Ain't That a Kick in the Head – Dean Martin (Elvis impersonator wedding/honeymoon scene)
 Linda Guerita – Brave Combo
 Si Tu Te Vas – Enrique Iglesias
 Mi Tierra – Gloria Estefan
 La Virgen de la Macarena – Pérez Prado
 Nothing is Permanent – Brave Combo
 La Bamba – Mariachi Vargas de Tecalitlán
 Los Machetes – Mariachi Vargas de Tecalitlán
 Fever – Peggy Lee (Alex's parents leaving Las Vegas scene)
 Talk to Me – Wild Orchid ("Boulevard Club" opening night scene)
 Naked Eye – Luscious Jackson ("Boulevard Club" opening night scene/Isabel walks out)
 I Wonder – Chris Isaak (Isabel on her way to her grandmother's house)
 Danke Schoen – Wayne Newton (Alex's "epiphany"/leaving New York)
 It's Now or Never – Elvis Presley (Alex on the trail to find Isabel)
 Can't Help Falling in Love – Elvis Presley (The "real wedding"/closing credits)

Reception
Fools Rush In received mixed reviews from critics. On Rotten Tomatoes the film has an approval rating of 34% based on reviews from 32 critics, with an average score of 5.2 out of 10. The consensus states: "Only Fools Rush In to see a basic romantic comedy where opposites try to attract and find an unlikely happy ending." At Metacritic, which assigns a weighted average using critical reviews, the film received a score of 37 out of 100 based on 17 reviews, indicating "generally unfavorable reviews". A more positive review came from Roger Ebert of The Chicago-Sun Times, who gave the film 3 stars out of a possible 4. He described Fools Rush In as "a sweet, entertaining retread of an ancient formula", elevated by good performances (particularly Hayek) and an insightful "level of observation and human comedy".

Box office
It grossed $29 million in the United States and Canada and $13 million internationally, for a worldwide total of $42 million.

Accolades

See also
 List of films set in Las Vegas

References

External links
 
 
 

1997 films
1990s pregnancy films
1997 romantic comedy-drama films
American romantic comedy-drama films
Films about weddings
Films set in Nevada
Films set in New York City
Films directed by Andy Tennant
Films about Mexican Americans
Films about interracial romance
American pregnancy films
American interfaith romance films
Films scored by Alan Silvestri
Columbia Pictures films
1997 romantic comedy films
1990s English-language films
1990s American films